"Echoes" is the first single to be released by British indie rock band Klaxons from their second studio album, Surfing the Void. The song was released through Polydor Records as a digital download on 15 August 2010, with a vinyl and CD single release the following day. The single was added to BBC Radio 1's A Playlist in July 2010. The single cover was shot by London-based photographer Ben Rayner. The song appears on Need for Speed: Hot Pursuit in 2010 along with the song "Twin Flames".

Music video
The music video to accompany the release of "Echoes" premiered on Channel 4 at 12:25 am on 17 July 2010 as part of a 4Music exclusive. It was then released on YouTube later that day from the band's record label YouTube page. The video features the band performing the song in the White Desert in Farafra, Egypt.

Track listing
 CD single

 7" single

Charts

Release history

References

2010 singles
Klaxons songs
2009 songs
Polydor Records singles

it:Echoes